Singapore competed at the 2004 Summer Paralympics in Athens, Greece. The team included 7 athletes, 4 men and 3 women, but won no medals.

Sports

Athletics
Azman Bin Yusof, Zaimoonisah Bte Mohamed Yussoff

Sailing
Leo Chen Ian, Lim Kok Liang, Sulaiman Bin Pungot, and Tan Wei Qiang Jovin

Swimming
Goh Rui Si Theresa

See also
Singapore at the Paralympics
Singapore at the 2004 Summer Olympics

References 

Nations at the 2004 Summer Paralympics
2004
Summer Paralympics